Vivian Vanessa Kubrick (born August 5, 1960), also credited under the pseudonym Abigail Mead, is an American filmmaker and composer. She is the daughter of filmmaker Stanley Kubrick.

Early life
Vivian Vanessa Kubrick was born on August 5, 1960 to filmmaker Stanley Kubrick and actress Christiane Kubrick (née Harlan). She had an elder sister, Anya, born April 6, 1959, and an elder half-sister, Katharina, from her mother's first marriage. Her father's family is Jewish.

Career
Kubrick made appearances in four of her father's films: as Dr. Floyd's daughter, nicknamed "Squirt", in 2001: A Space Odyssey (1968), as a guest at Bryan's birthday party in Barry Lyndon (1975), as a guest on a ballroom couch in The Shining (1980), and as a news camera operator at the site of a mass grave depicted in Full Metal Jacket (1987). 

At age 17, Kubrick directed and filmed a 35-minute documentary for the BBC, The Making of The Shining, which was edited by Gordon Stainforth and had some footage removed by Stanley Kubrick. After the release of the documentary in 1980, it became popular on the Kubrick fan site alt.movies.kubrick (amk) and distributed on DVDs of The Shining. In 2019, Alice Vincent wrote in The Telegraph that the film confirmed "her father deliberately mistreated [Shelley] Duvall, belittling her ideas and shutting her down while treating her co-star, Jack Nicholson, as an equal." According to Elizabeth Jean Hornbeck, writing in Feminist Studies in 2016, "Kubrick bullied Duvall into a near emotional breakdown, which took a toll on her health", some of which is documented in the film. According to Geoffrey Macnab, writing in The Independent in 2020, in the film, "Depending on your point of view, he is either bullying her or using sly, intimidatory tactics to goad the performance he wants out of her." In 2022, the 1981 Razzies award for "Worst Actress" given to Shelley Duvall for The Shining was rescinded based in part on footage from the documentary that depicts how Stanley Kubrick treated Duvall on set. 

She supervised and composed the score to Full Metal Jacket, using the pseudonym Abigail Mead. In 1986, she shot footage for a documentary on the making of the film, but it was not completed. Some of the footage was included in Stanley Kubrick: A Life in Pictures.

In October 2008, Kubrick attended a 40th anniversary screening of 2001: A Space Odyssey sponsored by the Jules Verne Society, along with actors Keir Dullea, Daniel Richter, and Malcolm McDowell. She accepted the Society's Legendaire Award on behalf of her father.

In 2016, Kubrick published an open letter denying the conspiracy theory that suggests her father helped fake the Apollo 11 moon landing, referring to the allegation as a "grotesque lie." In 2016, she also published an open letter to Phil McGraw (also known as Dr. Phil), after his 2016 interview with Shelley Duvall, stating "Your exploitive use of Shelly Duvall is a form of LURID ENTERTAINMENT and is shameful". She started a crowdfunding campaign for Duvall.

Filmography

Personal life
In 1995, she became a Scientologist.

References

External links

1960 births
Living people
American people of Austrian-Jewish descent
American people of German descent
American people of Romanian-Jewish descent
American people of Polish-Jewish descent
American child actresses
American Scientologists
Women film score composers
Jewish American actresses
20th-century American actresses
Actresses from Los Angeles
Stanley Kubrick
American film directors
20th-century American musicians